Exall v Partridge (1799) 101 ER 1405 is an English unjust enrichment law case, concerning enrichment through discharge of a debt, and the unjust factor of legal compulsion to give another a benefit.

Facts
Exall left his carriage on Partridge's land for repair. Partridge, a coachbuilder, was a co-tenant with the other defendants but the only one in occupation after having been assigned their interests. The rent was not paid and the landlord, Mr Welch seized Exall's carriage as distress, as was lawful. Exall paid the rent to recover the carriage and then sued Partridge and the other defendants to get his money back.

Judgment
The Court of King's Bench held the money could be recovered. Lord Kenyon CJ gave the first speech.

Grose J concurred.

Lawrence J concurred. So did Le Blanc J.

See also

English unjust enrichment law

Notes

References

English unjust enrichment case law
1799 in British law
1799 in case law
Court of King's Bench (England) cases